The 1981 Milan–San Remo was the 72nd edition of the Milan–San Remo cycle race and was held on 21 March 1981. The race started in Milan and finished in San Remo. The race was won by Alfons de Wolf of the Vermeer Thijs team.

General classification

References

1981
March 1981 sports events in Europe
1981 in road cycling
1981 in Italian sport
1981 Super Prestige Pernod